Bremer Sportclub Hastedt e.V., commonly known as BSC Hastedt, is a German association football club from Hastedt, a subdistrict in the city of Bremen, Bremen. It is a football club with three men's teams and five junior teams. The club currently only offers football.

History 
The club was founded on 1 June 2008 with the combination of the football departments of Hastedter TSV and Post-SV Bremen. Hastedter TSV was the more successful of the two clubs but only ever reached Bremen's highest amateur league.

BSC Hastedt as this new union started playing football in the 8th tier, Kreisliga A Bremen. In their second season, 2009–10, they finished in 1st place and won promotion to the Bezirksliga Bremen. Following promotion, they spent the next six seasons in the Bezirksliga finishing at best 5th on 3 separate occasions until in the 2015–16 season they won the league and earned promotion to Landesliga Bremen. Hastedt brought a strong team to the Landesliga and was able to fight all the way to the top of the table and with an away victory against SC Borgfeld on the last matchday,

In the 2017–18 season, Hastedt's first in Landesliga Bremen, they qualified for the final of the Bremer Landespokal against Blumenthaler SV. They won the final 3-0 and secured a place in the first round of the 2018–19 DFB-Pokal. They were drawn at home to Bundesliga side Borussia Mönchengladbach, They moved the venue to the larger Weserstadion Platz 11, where 4,997 fans saw them lose 1–11.

Honours 
The club's honours:

League
 Landesliga Bremen (VI)
 Champions: 2017
 Bezirksliga (VII)
 Champions: 2016
 Kreisliga A Bremen (VIII)
 Champions: 2010

Cup
 Bremen Cup
 Winners: 2018

Recent seasons 
The recent season-by-season performance of the club:

 Key

References

External links 
 
 BSC Hastedt profile at worldfootball.net

Football clubs in Germany
Football clubs in Bremen (state)
Association football clubs established in 2008
2008 establishments in Germany